German submarine U-989 was a Type VIIC U-boat built for Nazi Germany's Kriegsmarine for service during World War II.
She was laid down on 17 October 1942 by Blohm & Voss, Hamburg as yard number 189, launched on 16 June 1943 and commissioned on 22 July 1943 under Oberleutnant zur See Hardo Rodler von Roithberg.

Design
German Type VIIC submarines were preceded by the shorter Type VIIB submarines. U-989 had a displacement of  when at the surface and  while submerged. She had two shafts and two  propellers.

U-989 was fitted with five  torpedo tubes (four fitted at the bow and one at the stern), fourteen torpedoes, one  SK C/35 naval gun, 220 rounds, and one twin  C/30 anti-aircraft gun. The boat had a complement of between forty-four and sixty.

Service history
The boat's career began with training at 5th U-boat Flotilla on 22 July 1943, followed by active service on 1 February 1944 as part of the 9th Flotilla. On 1 October 1944 she transferred to 33rd Flotilla for the remainder of her service.

Wolfpacks
U-989 took part in three wolfpacks, namely:
 Stürmer (26 January – 3 February 1944)
 Igel 1 (3 – 17 February 1944)
 Hai 1 (17 – 22 February 1944)

Fate
All hands were lost.

Summary of raiding history

References

Bibliography

External links

German Type VIIC submarines
1943 ships
U-boats commissioned in 1943
Ships lost with all hands
U-boats sunk in 1945
U-boats sunk by depth charges
U-boats sunk by British warships
World War II shipwrecks in the Atlantic Ocean
World War II submarines of Germany
Ships built in Hamburg
Maritime incidents in February 1945